Barbodes binotatus, commonly known as the spotted barb or common barb, is a tropical species of cyprinid fish endemic to Java, Indonesia.

Description
Its color in life varies from a silvery gray to greenish gray, darker dorsally and paler or nearly white on its throat and belly.  It has a bar behind the operculum on its shoulder.  On large fish, body markings (spots or band) may be absent, except for the spot on the caudal base.  It has a round, broad-tipped snout equal to or slightly larger than the eye.   The fish will grow in length up to 7.75 inches (20.0 cm).

Distribution and habitat
The species was previously thought to have a much wider native range in Southeast Asia, but it is now known that B. binotatus sensu stricto is restricted to the island of Java in Indonesia. All other descriptions of B. binotatus sensu lato in other areas of Southeast Asia are either mistaken identifications of similar species or undescribed taxa superficially similar to B. binotatus.

Its native environment occurs from about sea level to above 2,000 m above sea level.  It is commonly found below waterfalls in isolated mountain streams and on small islands inhabited by few other freshwater fish.  It inhabits medium to large rivers, stagnant water bodies.   It is usually found in the middle to bottom depths of fairly shallow waters where it feeds on zooplankton, insect larvae and some vascular plants.  They live in a tropical climate and prefer water with a 6.0 - 6.5 pH, a water hardness of 12.0 dGH, and a temperature range of 75 - 79 °F (24 - 26 °C).

Reproduction
An open water, substrate egg-scatter, the adult barbs will spawn around dawn.

Importance to humans
The spotted barb is of commercial importance in the aquarium trade and of minor importance in the fisheries industry.

See also
 List of freshwater aquarium fish species

References

External links
 Photos from Fishbase

Barbs (fish)
Fish described in 1842
Endemic fauna of Indonesia